The Antler–Lyleton Border Crossing connects the cities of Antler, North Dakota and Pierson, Manitoba on the Canada–United States border. It is reached by North Dakota Highway 256 in Bottineau County on the American side and Manitoba Provincial Road 256 in the Municipality of Two Borders on the Canadian side.

The United States replaced its border station in 2011.  Canada replaced the Lyleton border station in 2013.

See also
 List of Canada–United States border crossings

References 

Canada–United States border crossings
1938 establishments in Manitoba
1938 establishments in North Dakota
Buildings and structures in Bottineau County, North Dakota